The 2015–16 FC Krylia Sovetov Samara season was the club's 1st season back in the Russian Premier League, the highest tier of association football in Russia, since their relegation at the end of the 2013–14 season and 21st in total. Krylia Sovetov finished 9th in the league, whilst also reaching the 'Round of 16' in the Russian Cup.

Squad

Transfers

Summer

In:

Out:

Winter

In:

Out:

Competitions

Russian Premier League

Results by round

Matches

League table

Russian Cup

Squad statistics

Appearances and goals

|-
|colspan="14"|Players away from the club on loan:

|-
|colspan="14"|Players who appeared for Krylia Sovetov no longer at the club:

|}

Goal Scorers

Disciplinary Record

References

External links
Official website 
Official website 

PFC Krylia Sovetov Samara seasons
Krylia Sovetov Samara